Big Band Wonderland is jazz vocalist Gary Williams's eighth album, recorded in Kenilworth Studios in 2015. It is a collection of Christmas classics, recorded with full big band and featuring duets with Clare Teal and Michael Feinstein. More than half of the money for the album was raised with a crowd-funding appeal.

This is how Williams described his love of Christmas: "I was raised as a Jehovah's Witness, so I didn't celebrate Christmas till I was sixteen years old. When all my mates where out singing carols I was sitting at home cataloguing my stamp collection! Maybe that's why I love Christmas so much now, I'm making up for lost time."

His live Christmas show was given five stars by the London Evening Standard which described Gary as "…the UK's leading standard bearer for the supercool era".

Track listing

Personnel 
Performers
 Gary Williams – vocals
 Matt Regan – piano
 Joe Pettitt – bass
 Kevin Campbell – drums
 Jon Russell – guitar
 Tom Walsh – trumpets
 Simon Marsh and Jay Craig – saxes
 Chris Traves – trombone
 Anthony Kerr – vibes
 The Patriot Girls (Jo Gibb, Joanne Pullen, Marissa Dunlop)
 Backing Singers: Luke Evered, David Hilton, Victoria Keal, Iain Mackenzie, India Moynihan, Andy Playfoot, Patrick Smyth.
Technical
 Producer and Studio Engineer: Chris Traves
 Executive Producer: Gary Williams
 Backing vocals arranged, directed and produced by Clive Dunstall
 Backing vocals recorded and mixed at Big Al’s studio by Alex Bourne, and Tileyard Studios by Sean Hargreaves
 Arrangers: Phil Steel (tracks 1, 2, 3); Paul Campbell (tracks 4, 5, 8, 10, 11, 12); Andrew Cottee (tracks 7, 13); Callum Au (tracks 6, 9)

References

External links 
 Official Gary Williams web site: Big Band Wonderland

2015 albums
Gary Williams (singer) albums